Kinchen Holloway House, also known as Guess Mill House, is a historic home located at Durham, Durham County, North Carolina.  It was built about 1870, and is a two-story, three bay, frame I-house with a one-story, gable-roof rear ell.  It was built by Kinchen Holloway, a farmer and miller.

It was listed on the National Register of Historic Places in 2008.

References

Houses on the National Register of Historic Places in North Carolina
Houses completed in 1870
Houses in Durham, North Carolina
I-houses in North Carolina
National Register of Historic Places in Durham County, North Carolina